The 1984 West Dorset District Council election was held on Thursday 3 May 1984 to elect councillors to West Dorset District Council in England. It took place on the same day as other district council elections in the United Kingdom. One third of seats were up for election.

The 1984 election saw the Independent councillors lose seats but maintain their majority control on the Council.

Ward results

Beaminster

Bridport North

Bridport South

Burton Bradstock

Caundle Vale

Charminster

Charmouth

Chesil Bank

Chickerell

Dorchester South

Dorchester West

Frome Valley

Lyme Regis

Maiden Newton

Piddle Valley

Sherborne West

Thorncombe

Whitchurch Canonicorum

References

West Dorset
1984
20th century in Dorset